The Guildford Phoenix are an amateur ice hockey team based in Guildford, England. They currently play in the NIHL 2 South West Division. The Guildford Phoenix are a minor league affiliate of the Guildford Flames of the Elite Ice Hockey League. Phoenix gained extensive media coverage in October 2019, following the signing of former Chelsea and Arsenal goalkeeper Petr Čech.

Season-by-season record

References 

Ice hockey teams in England
Sport in Guildford
Ice hockey clubs established in 2017